Noel William O'Brien (born 18 December 1956) is an English former professional footballer who played in the Football League for Mansfield Town.

References

1956 births
Living people
English footballers
Association football midfielders
English Football League players
Arsenal F.C. players
Mansfield Town F.C. players
Wimbledon F.C. players
Halifax Town A.F.C. players